Darius Constantin Grosu (born 7 June 2002) is a Romanian professional footballer who plays as a right back for Liga I side  Farul Constanța.

Club career

Viitorul Constanta
He made his league debut on 17 June 2020 in Liga I match against Chindia.

Career statistics

Club

References

External links
 
 
 

2002 births
Living people
Romanian footballers
Romania youth international footballers
Association football midfielders
Liga I players
Liga II players
Liga III players
FC Viitorul Constanța players
FCV Farul Constanța players\
FC Metaloglobus București players
Sportspeople from Constanța